High Plains Invaders is a 2009 American Western science fiction television film that aired on the Syfy Channel. It is the 21st film of the Maneater Series. The film stars James Marsters.

Plot

A man goes to a small Colorado town to be hanged for his crimes in 1892 only to end up rescuing the town.

Cast
 James Marsters as Sam Danville
 Cindy Sampson as Abigail Pixley
 Sebastian Knapp as Jules Arning
 Sanny van Heteren as Rose Hilridge
 Antony Byrne as Gus McGreevey
 Angus MacInnes as Silich Cure
 Adriana Butoi as Prospector's Wife
 James Carroll Jordan as Sheriff (as James Jordan)
 Constantin Barbulescu as Grizzled Miner
 Dan Bordeianu as Deputy
 Dugald Bruce-Lockhart as Cornelius Harrington (as Dugald Bruce Lockhart)
 Sorin Cristea as Prospector Franklin

Production
High Plains Invaders was filmed in Romania in December 2008. Marsters said the film was a way to reinvent the Western film genre, which often had the same elements and types of characters, by including alien bugs.

Home media

Reception
High Plains Invaders has had mixed reviews. Dread Central wrote, "High Plains Invaders is an above average Syfy original, a pleasantly diverting Wild West creature feature worthy of a Saturday matinee viewing." The website said the acting was standard and that the creature design was reminiscent of the bugs from Starship Troopers. It also said the budget limitations were evident: "We see what looks like thousands of these bugs dropping from the mothership but only see them attack one at a time until the very final moments. The computer animated bugs look fairly credible, which may be due in some small part to how inorganically metallic they are meant to look in the first place." DVD Talk said that the film was "formulaic" like other films in the Maneater series. The website commended how it mixed genres such as Western and science fiction. It concluded, "Outside of its genre-hopping and setting, High Plains Invaders doesn't stray too much from this formula. However, at a breezy 87 minutes, Richard Beattie's script directed by K.T. Donaldson is never boring—and the requisite Saturday matinee ambience is always present." FEARnet said, "Screenwriter Richard Beattie seems to enjoy wading in the caricatured side of the genre pool, which means that each character is painted in rather broad brushstrokes. This helps to keep High Plains Invaders from ever becoming too dreary or boring—but it also means the five main characters are left spouting dialogue that, even if it's 'cute,' it's still pretty damn familiar." The website called the creature effects "more polished than you'd normally find" but noted how few were actually shown at any one time. It concluded, "Whereas most of the Maneater Series are 'guilty pleasures' at best, this one actually earns a few points in the realm of legitimate low-budget monster-making."

References

External links
 
 
 

2009 television films
2009 films
Western (genre) television films
American television films
2000s English-language films
Films set in 1892
Films shot in Romania
Maneater (film series)
Syfy original films
Films set in Colorado
2000s American films